Lionel Morgan (born 12 August 1938) is an Indigenous Australian former rugby league footballer, named amongst the nation's finest of the 20th century. He is currently a coach. Morgan was the first Indigenous Australian to be selected to play in a recognised rugby league Test match. He primarily played on the wing.

Rugby League career
A New South Wales' Schoolboy representative player, Morgan moved from Tweed Heads to play for Wynnum-Manly in the Brisbane Rugby League premiership. In 1960 he was selected for the second and third Tests of the French tour of Australia. He scored two tries on his international debut. At the end of the 1960 season, he played one match for Australia in the 1960 World Cup, again against France, at Wigan. Morgan's selection for the Tests made him the first Indigenous Australian to represent at an international level in any major national sporting team. In 1962 he was named Queensland's Best Back.

A representative of Brisbane in the Bulimba Cup, Morgan scored 24 tries and 147 points in just 18 games between 1959 and 1963. In 1962, he scored 5 tries and 6 goals in a single match against Ipswich.

Morgan was subjected to racism throughout his career. He has described an incident in a match against Ipswich. "I was tackled over the sideline, and apparently the whole Ipswich team jumped on top of me," he said. "I woke up in hospital." In another incident he was hospitalised after being punched by a spectator.

Morgan's four sons all spent time playing for Wynnum-Manly.

Morgan continued his association with rugby league as coach of the Queensland Rugby League's Indigenous Under-16 team.

Honour
In August, 2008, Morgan was named on the wing in the Indigenous Team of the Century.

Footnotes

Other sources
 
Queensland representatives at qrl.com.au

1938 births
Living people
Australia national rugby league team players
Brisbane rugby league team players
Indigenous Australian rugby league players
Queensland rugby league team players
Rugby league players from Tweed Heads, New South Wales
Rugby league wingers
Wynnum Manly Seagulls players